Arrol may refer to:

People
 Arrol Corelli (born 1985), Indian composer
 Ian MacLachlan Arrol (1924–2000), English politician
 William Arrol (1839–1913), Scottish civil engineer

Places
 Arrol Gantry, Northern Ireland
 Arrol Icefall, Antarctica

Companies
 Arrol-Aster, Scottish manufacturer of automobiles
 Arrol-Johnston, Scottish manufacturer of automobiles
 Sir William Arrol & Co., Scottish civil engineering and construction business